Valley Township, Ohio may refer to:
Valley Township, Guernsey County, Ohio
Valley Township, Scioto County, Ohio

Ohio township disambiguation pages